"Strong Enough to Be Your Man" is a song written and recorded by American country music artist Travis Tritt.  It was released in July 2002 as the first single from the album Strong Enough.  The song reached number 13 on the Billboard Hot Country Singles & Tracks chart.

It is an answer song to Sheryl Crow's 1994 single "Strong Enough".

Chart performance

References

2002 singles
2002 songs
Travis Tritt songs
Songs written by Travis Tritt
Song recordings produced by Billy Joe Walker Jr.
Columbia Records singles
Answer songs